Go Soeda was the defending champion.

Seeds

Draw

Finals

Top half

Bottom half

References
 Main Draw
 Qualifying Draw

ATP Challenger China International - Nanchang - Singles
2015 Singles